Ayık is a given name for males and a surname. Notable people with the surname include:

Surname Ayık 
 Ahmet Ayık, Turkish sport wrestler
 Onur Ayık, Turkish-German footballer

Surname Ayik 
 Arop Yor Ayik, Sudanese academic
 Hakan Ayik, Turkish-Australian criminal

Turkish-language surnames
Turkish masculine given names